JS Yamayuki (DD-129/TV-3519) was a  of the Japan Maritime Self-Defense Force (JMSDF).

Construction and career
The ship was built by Hitachi Zosen at their Maizuru shipyard, laid down on 25 February 1983 and launched on 10 July 1984. Yamayuki was commissioned into service on 3 December 1985.

This ship was one of several in the JMSDF fleet participating in disaster relief after the 2011 Tōhoku earthquake and tsunami.

She was converted to a training vessel and redesignated as TV-3519 on 27 April 2016. She was retired on 19 March 2020.

References

External links

Hatsuyuki-class destroyers
1984 ships
Ships built by Hitachi Zosen Corporation
Training ships of the Japan Maritime Self-Defense Force